Surprise Package may refer to:

 Surprise Package (film), a 1960 American comedy film
 Surprise package (band), an American rock band
 Surprise Package (gunship), the second iteration of the Lockheed AC-130 gunship program

See also

 Pochette Surprise (Surprise Package), the debut album by French singer Jordy